Constituency NA-102 (Hafizabad-I) was a constituency for the National Assembly of Pakistan. It was one of the two constituencies for the district of Hafizabad before the 2018 delimitations. After the delimitations, the two constituencies were merged into one: NA-87.

Election 2002 

General elections were held on 10 Oct 2002. Chaudhry Mehdi Hasan Bhatti of PML-Q won by 50,824 votes.

Election 2008 

General elections were held on 18 Feb 2008. Saira Afzal Tarar of PML-N won by 56,313 votes.

Election 2013 

General elections were held on 11 May 2013. Saira Afzal Tarar of PML-N won by 93,691 votes and became the  member of National Assembly.

References

External links
 Election result's official website

NA-102
Abolished National Assembly Constituencies of Pakistan